Body Blow is the second studio album by New Zealand rock band the Headless Chickens. It was originally released in 1991, then rereleased for Australia in 1993 with a substantially reworked track list, losing "Crash Hot" and "Road Train" but gaining "Mr. Moon", "Juice", "Choppers" and some remixes. Another Australian version followed in 1994 with the addition of a bonus disc containing six remixes.

Body Blow is Headless Chickens' most successful album, including three top-10 singles and achieving double platinum sales. The album includes a cover of "Inside Track", originally recorded as "The Inside Track" by New Zealand new wave band Stridulators.

Reviewed in Rolling Stone Australia, the first single, "Gaskrankinstation", was noted for its inability to be categorised. It was described as a "tragic saga of a callous fool trapped in a dumb job and a loveless marriage. The tempo builds inexorably with the sense of an impending catastrophe."

On 29 March 2019, an extended version was reissued.

Track listing

Personnel 
Headless Chickens
 Chris Matthews – vocals, guitar, keyboards
 Fiona McDonald – vocals, keyboards
 Grant Fell – bass, keyboards
 Michael Lawry – keyboards
 Anthony Nevison – vocals, guitar, bass, keyboards
 Bevan Sweeney – drums

Additional personnel
 Rex Visible – keyboards

Production
 Rex Visible – engineer, producer
 Michael Koppelman – engineer, producer
 Anthony Nevison – engineer
 Phil "Feel" Jones – engineer assistant

Chart positions

Album charts

Certifications

References

1991 albums
1993 albums
Headless Chickens albums
Flying Nun Records albums